Ayouch is a surname. Notable people with the surname include:
 Amal Ayouch (born 1966), Moroccan actress
 Nabil Ayouch (born 1969), French-Moroccan television and film director, producer and writer
  (born 1945), Moroccan social activist and businessman

Surnames of Moroccan origin